Maileen Nuudi (born 24 May 2000) is an Estonian tennis player.

Playing for the Estonia Fed Cup team, Nuudi has a win/loss record of 8–9.

ITF finals

Singles: 2 (2 titles)

Doubles: 1 (runner-up)

Fed Cup participation

Singles

Doubles

References

External links
 
 
 

2000 births
Living people
Estonian female tennis players
21st-century Estonian women